or sometimes Aichi University Junior College is a private junior college in Toyohashi, Aichi, Japan.

History 
The junior college was founded in 1950 with two academic departments: Literature, and Law and Economics. In 1961, a third academic department, Life Sciences, was set up for women only. In 1979, the department of Law and Economics was discontinued. In 2000 the departments of Life Science, and Literature were renamed. In 2005 the two were merged into one.

See also 
 Aichi University

References

External links 
 

Educational institutions established in 1950
Japanese junior colleges
1950 establishments in Japan
Universities and colleges in Aichi Prefecture
Toyohashi